Neil Druckmann (born December 5, 1978) is an Israeli-American writer, creative director, designer, and programmer who has been co-president (alongside Evan Wells) of the video game developer Naughty Dog since 2020. He is best known for his work on the Naughty Dog game franchises Uncharted and The Last of Us, having co-created the latter.

Druckmann's first video game work came as an intern at Naughty Dog. In 2004, he became a programmer on Jak 3 (2004) and Jak X: Combat Racing (2005), before becoming a designer for Uncharted: Drake's Fortune (2007). He was co-lead game designer for Uncharted 2: Among Thieves (2009), which he co-wrote with Amy Hennig and Josh Scherr; the narrative was praised and received several accolades. He has also written comics, including the motion comic Uncharted: Eye of Indra (2009) and the graphic novels A Second Chance at Sarah (2010) and The Last of Us: American Dreams (2013).

Druckmann led the development of The Last of Us (2013) as writer and creative director, roles he continued for The Last of Us: Left Behind (2014) and Uncharted 4: A Thief's End (2016), co-writing the latter with Scherr. All three games were directed by Bruce Straley, with whom Druckmann developed a close working relationship. He and Craig Mazin are the creators, writers, and executive producers for the television adaptation of The Last of Us for HBO, for which Druckmann directed an episode.

Druckmann was promoted to vice president of Naughty Dog in 2018 during the development of The Last of Us Part II (2020), for which he was creative director and co-writer with Halley Gross, and was promoted to co-president in 2020. He has earned praise for his writing and directing work on The Last of Us, Uncharted 4, and The Last of Us Part II. The games are often regarded as among the best written and have been listed as some of the greatest video games ever made. Druckmann has received several awards, including three British Academy Games Awards, four D.I.C.E. Awards, two Game Awards, three Game Developers Choice Awards, and four Writers Guild of America Awards.

Early life 
Neil Druckmann was born into a Jewish family in Tel Aviv, Israel, on December 5, 1978, the son of Yehudith and Jerry Druckmann. He was raised in Beit Aryeh, a settlement in the West Bank, where he recalled violence was a frequent topic on the news and in conversations at home. As an escape, his older brother Emanuel introduced him to comic books, video games, and movies at a young age. These forms of entertainment, particularly video games by Sierra Entertainment and LucasArts, helped him learn English. He became particularly interested in storytelling and wrote his own comic books. He moved to the U.S. with his family in 1989, attending middle school and high school in Miami, Florida. He then studied criminology, aiming to get experience as an FBI agent to use when writing novels. His brother snuck him into E3 in the late 1990s, and he attended the conference again in 1998, 2000, and 2002, as well as SIGGRAPH in 2002 and 2003. As a student at Florida State University in 2001, he won a Conker's Bad Fur Day multiplayer competition organized by Nintendo and Playboy. While studying, he worked as a clerk at My Favorite Muffin and a salesman at PacSun.

From July 2002, while living in Tallahassee, Druckmann spent a year as a graphics research assistant at Florida State University's Visualization Lab. During this time, he and some friends began developing the game Pink-Bullet for Linux and Windows. At one point, he wanted to be an animator, which required enlisting in art classes, but his parents forbade him from doing so. After taking a programming class, Druckmann realized that it was his preference, and he began a Bachelor of Computer Science with a minor in math in December 2002, graduating cum laude the following year with a grade point average of 3.61. Due to his academic results, he was a member of the Golden Key Honor Society. He then moved to Pittsburgh, where he attended Carnegie Mellon University, and began his master's degree in entertainment technology in August 2003 at the Entertainment Technology Center. As part of the degree, he took a game design class by Jesse Schell, which taught him philosophies he would use later. In April 2004, Druckmann developed the game Dikki Painguin in: TKO for the Third Reich for the NES as a student at Carnegie Mellon, in collaboration with fellow student Allan Blomquist.

Career

Intern and programmer (2003–2005) 
One of Druckmann's professors paid for him to attend the Game Developers Conference (GDC) in 2003, where he attended a presentation by Naughty Dog co-founder Jason Rubin. After Druckmann "bugged" Rubin, the latter gave him his business card. Some time later, Rubin contacted Druckmann and offered him an intern position, a first for Naughty Dog. By the time Druckmann responded, the position had been taken. When encouraged to apply for internships by CMU, Druckmann reached out to Rubin for advice, and was told about a new internship at the studio. He was put in contact with game director Evan Wells, who offered him the internship after an interview at GDC. During this time, he had also been offered an intern producer position at Electronic Arts on The Sims 2; he extended the offer in order to interview with Wells. In around May 2004, Druckmann joined Naughty Dog as a programming intern. He began working on localization tools and gameplay programming on Jak 3 (2004). During this time, he would also offer assistance with additional design tasks. By the end of the internship in August, he was offered a full-time position by Wells and Stephen White, then co-presidents. He received credit for the second year of his master's degree through his work at Naughty Dog, earning the degree in 2005. He programmed the menu screens on Jak X: Combat Racing (2005), which he considered one of the most difficult tasks of his career. He continued to assist with smaller design tasks where possible.

Designer and writer (2005–2009) 

During the development of Jak 3 and Jak X, Druckmann continued to ask Wells about joining the design team. Wells restrained from transferring him, as he was originally employed as a programmer and lacked experience in design, but agreed to review Druckmann's design work if he completed them in his spare time. Druckmann iterated on several level designs with Wells's feedback, initially on graph paper and later using Adobe Illustrator. Following the development of Jak X, Wells concluded that Druckmann was skilled in design, and gave him a design position for Jak and Daxter: The Lost Frontier. Several months into development, Wells transferred Druckmann to work as a game designer on Uncharted: Drake's Fortune (2007), which was facing development troubles at the time; High Impact Games took over work on The Lost Frontier, which was released in 2009. In his position as game designer on Drake's Fortune, he worked closely with Amy Hennig to construct the story, before working on Uncharted 2: Among Thieves (2009) as a lead game designer, becoming more involved with the core writing of the game.

In 2009, Druckmann worked on the motion comic Uncharted: Eye of Indra, as writer and director. A prequel to Drake's Fortune, Eye of Indra tells the story of Nathan Drake prior to the events of the first game. Druckmann's first graphic novel, A Second Chance at Sarah, was published by Ape Entertainment in February 2010. With illustrations by artist Joysuke Wong, the novel relates Druckmann's interest in traveling back in time to meet his wife at a younger age. "There's something cute and poetic about that idea," Druckmann explained. He felt that he shares many similarities with the novel's protagonist Johnny, and that "a lot of Johnny's flaws and fears are based on [his] own shortcomings". The comic was originally released on February 24, 2010; critics particularly praised Wong's illustrations, as well as Druckmann's writing and character development.

Creative director (2010–2018) 
Following the development of Uncharted 2, Naughty Dog split into two teams to work on projects concurrently. With one team working on Uncharted 3: Drake's Deception (2011), co-presidents Evan Wells and Christophe Balestra chose Druckmann and Bruce Straley to lead development on a new game; Druckmann was chosen for his determination and talent for design. Though they were originally set to develop a new game in the Jak and Daxter series, the team felt that they "weren't doing service to the fans of [the] franchise", and decided to create a new game, titled The Last of Us.

When conceiving ideas for The Last of Us, Druckmann used a concept that he created as a student at Carnegie Mellon University. His idea was to merge the gameplay of Ico (2001) in a story set during a zombie apocalypse, like that of Night of the Living Dead (1968), with a lead character similar to John Hartigan from Sin City (1991–2000). The lead character, a police officer, would be tasked with protecting a young girl; however, due to his heart condition, players would often assume control of the young girl, reversing the roles. He based The Last of Us on this concept, replacing the police officer with Joel, and naming the young girl Ellie. Druckmann wrote The Last of Us with the intention of having the story "rooted firmly within reality", a stark departure from Naughty Dog's previous "light and loose" feeling. "It needed to go a little darker [than Uncharted] to explore a sadder theme," he explained. Prior to directing the game, Druckmann took acting classes in order to "talk to [the actors] in the same language". The game was released on June 14, 2013, with praise for Druckmann's work on the story. He earned numerous awards, including a BAFTA, a D.I.C.E. Award, a Game Developers Choice Award, a Golden Joystick Award, and a Writers Guild of America Award. The Last of Us is often regarded one of the best-written video games, and one of the greatest video games ever made.

Druckmann later worked on the downloadable expansion pack The Last of Us: Left Behind, a prequel focusing on Ellie's relationship with her friend Riley, which received critical acclaim. He earned additional accolades for his work on Left Behind, including a second BAFTA and Writers Guild of America Award. In particular, he was praised for writing a scene involving a kiss between two female characters, which was named a "breakthrough moment" for video games. He also co-wrote the four-issue comic book miniseries The Last of Us: American Dreams, with writer and artist Faith Erin Hicks. It was published by Dark Horse Comics, with the first issue released in April 2013, and was lauded for Druckmann's writing and character development, as well as Hicks' simplistic illustrations.

Following Hennig's departure from Naughty Dog in March 2014, it was announced that Druckmann and Straley were working on Uncharted 4: A Thief's End (2016) as creative director and game director respectively. Initial reports claimed that Hennig was "forced out" of Naughty Dog by Druckmann and Straley, though co-presidents Evan Wells and Christophe Balestra later denied this. Druckmann co-wrote the story alongside Josh Scherr; Druckmann considered Scherr the "funny one", allowing him to write the humour of Uncharted 4 due to Druckmann's self-professed inability to write jokes. He appreciated the collaboration of writing on Uncharted 4, having written The Last of Us almost entirely independently. The game was released on May 10, 2016, and praised for its story. It was awarded Best Narrative at The Game Awards 2016, and Outstanding Achievement in Videogame Writing at the 69th Writers Guild of America Awards. Dave Meikleham of GamesRadar+ found Uncharted 4 among the best-written video games, and it is often regarded as among the greatest games. Druckmann acted as head of narrative development for Uncharted: The Lost Legacy, released in August 2017.

In March 2014, Sony announced that Druckmann was writing a film adaptation of The Last of Us, produced by Sam Raimi and distributed by Screen Gems. By January 2015, he had written the script's second draft, and performed a read-through with some actors. Very little work occurred following this, as Druckmann stated in April 2016 that the film had entered development hell, and in February 2018 said "I don't want that movie to be made." Druckmann worked as a playtester for What Remains of Edith Finch (2017). In August 2017, he was featured as a guest judge on an episode of Face Off.

Vice president and co-president (2018–present) 

Druckmann was promoted to vice president of Naughty Dog in March 2018. He returned as creative director for The Last of Us Part II (2020), co-writing the game alongside Halley Gross; Straley did not return to co-direct the game. The game's themes of revenge and retribution were inspired by Druckmann's own experiences growing up in Israel, where violence was a frequent topic. He specifically recalled watching footage of the 2000 Ramallah lynching, and how, after hearing the cheering crowds, his mind immediately turned to violent thoughts about bringing the perpetrators to justice; he later felt "gross and guilty" for having these thoughts. He wanted the player to feel a "thirst for revenge" before making them realize the reality of their actions. Druckmann noted that some members of the team felt reluctant about the game's cynicism, but ultimately he preferred a divisive story than a "mundane" one.

The Last of Us Part II released on June 19, 2020, to critical acclaim. The story polarized critics; some praised the writing for its nuance and effectiveness, while others criticized its pacing and repetition of themes. The audience backlash towards the story led to Druckmann becoming the target of online hate and death threats, which were condemned by Naughty Dog. Druckmann makes a brief cameo appearance in the game as the voice of Briggs, a Washington Liberation Front soldier. An Easter egg in the game's collectible trading cards also references Druckmann in the fictional character Doctor Uckmann. The Last of Us Part II holds the record for most Game of the Year awards, surpassing previous record holder The Witcher 3: Wild Hunt (2015). For their work on the game, Druckmann and Gross were awarded at the D.I.C.E. Awards, The Game Awards, Game Developers Choice Awards, Golden Joystick Awards, SXSW Gaming Awards, and Titanium Awards. Druckmann was also nominated at the Visual Effects Society Awards. The Last of Us Part II is regarded as among the best-written video games.

Druckmann was promoted to co-president of Naughty Dog, serving alongside Wells, on December 4, 2020. He was included on the Variety500 list in December 2020, identifying the most influential business leaders in the media industry. Druckmann was an executive producer on the film Uncharted (2022). With Craig Mazin, Druckmann is a writer and executive producer on the television adaptation of The Last of Us for HBO. Druckmann directed the second episode in October and November 2021; he felt his experience reinforced and reflected his experience in directing games. Druckmann noted the series was taking the opposite approach to adaptation than Uncharted; while Uncharted tells a new story with moments from the games to give "an Uncharted flavor", The Last of Us is a direct adaptation with minor deviations, allowing alterations such as changing character perspectives in a manner unachievable in an immersive game. The series premiered in January 2023 to positive reviews; several critics considered it the best live-action adaptation of a video game. Reviewers praised the differences from the original game's narrative implemented by Mazin and Druckmann. Several critics praised Druckmann's directing on the second episode; Total Films Russell praised Druckmann's "keen eye for beauty in this shattered world", citing a shot of a frog on a piano as a standout.

In December 2021, Druckmann presented Game of the Year at The Game Awards. At Summer Game Fest in June 2022, he revealed that he is working on a new game; he later said he was assembling a writers' room for the game, which will be "structured more like a TV show" than any of Naughty Dog's previous projects. He had a cameo voice appearance in Return to Monkey Island (2022).

Writing style 
Druckmann's writing philosophy, which he realized while talking to game designer Cory Barlog, is "simple story, complex characters"; Druckmann dislikes video games with complicated exposition, but enjoys writing complex character relationships. Throughout his writing, Druckmann approaches scenes with focus on every character, attempting to enter the mindset of each one. He tries to ignore character tropes in an attempt to write "honestly". Druckmann also writes with a minimalist mindset, often asking himself "What is this scene really about? What's the least we have to say or do to convey that and no more?"

Before writing The Last of Us and Uncharted 4, Druckmann and Straley created entire outlines of the stories, before exploring the narrative more intricately, discussing the "moment-to-moment beats" of each level that lead to a bigger event. They began with the middle of the story, as it is the core of the gameplay and narrative, before exploring the game's climax and character development. The Frame host John Horn identified a repeating theme in Druckmann's stories, including A Second Chance at Sarah and The Last of Us, is the concept of characters attempting or hoping to alter their past in some way; Druckmann admitted he had not noticed this trend, though agreed with it and recognized its recurrence.

Influences 
Druckmann cites game writer Sam Lake as a large inspiration, naming himself a "longtime fan". Druckmann's favorite video games include Monkey Island 2: LeChuck's Revenge (1991), Ico, Metal Gear Solid 2: Sons of Liberty (2001), and Resident Evil 4 (2005), and he is often inspired by character-focused comics such as Preacher (1995–2000), and Y: The Last Man (2002–2008). Druckmann was also influenced by the character-driven storytelling in the adventure game King's Quest by Roberta Williams. While writing The Last of Us, Druckmann was inspired by several films, including: Unforgiven (1992), for its ability to make audiences support the protagonist despite his immorality; No Country for Old Men (2007), due to its subtle and sparse execution, forcing audience engagement; and Gravity (2013), in regards to simplicity and intensity.

Views 

Druckmann is a regular advocate of gender equality in video games, citing Anita Sarkeesian as an influence; he presented the Ambassador Award to Sarkeesian at the 2014 Game Developers Choice Awards, and regularly advocated her projects. When Druckmann found that he regularly wrote about "white, straight, Christian male" characters, he was prompted to instead create more diverse characters. Throughout the development of Uncharted 4, Druckmann was influenced by concept artist Ashley Swidowski to include more female characters in the game. "She is constantly challenging me and pushing for diversity in our cast", he said. Upon focus testers' criticism regarding the inclusion and portrayal of female characters in Uncharted 4, one of whom was forced to leave due to an outburst, Druckmann expressed "Wow, why does that matter?"

Similarly, Ellie of The Last of Us was initially received negatively in early focus tests. Druckmann is proud that Ellie is a "strong, non-sexualized female lead character", and hoped that other developers would take similar approaches to characters without fear of unpopularity. Druckmann and Straley were surprised by some of the backlash in regards to gender roles in The Last of Us, although Druckmann noted that "the more progress we make, the more those problems stand out". He declared it a "misconception" that female protagonists hinder game sales, evidenced by the success of The Last of Us.

Personal life 
Druckmann resides with his children in Santa Monica, California, where he bought a property in 2019; his house was styled by designer Kim Gordon. He and his wife, Maya, began dating while he was studying his undergraduate degree. He became a father during the development of The Last of Us, and has said that his daughter was a "huge inspiration" to him when writing the game. He found that the birth of his daughter reinforced his ideas about family, as he realized he would "do anything" for her.

Druckmann has a dent in his skull from being accidentally struck in the head with a golf club by a friend at the age of 16, which required 30 stitches. On his first day as director on The Last of Us, he suffered from headaches and began seeing double; he discovered the following day that he required emergency eye surgery, as an infection threatened the vision in his left eye.

Druckmann holds American citizenship, having voted and promoted voting in the 2016 presidential election, 2018 midterm elections, 2020 primary elections, and 2020 presidential election. In his spare time, he plays the guitar and joins his children in playing video games such as Animal Crossing and Pokémon. During production of The Last of Us Part II, he practiced intermittent fasting, which is referenced in one of the game's collectible cards.

Works

Video games

Film and television

Literature

Awards and nominations

References

External links

1978 births
21st-century American writers
American chief executives
American people of Israeli descent
American television directors
American television writers
American video game designers
American video game directors
BAFTA winners (people)
Carnegie Mellon University alumni
Creative directors
Israeli chief executives
Israeli Jews
Israeli television directors
Israeli television writers
Israeli settlers
Jewish American writers
Jewish video game developers
Living people
Male feminists
Naughty Dog people
People from the West Bank
Uncharted
University of Florida alumni
Video game writers
Writers from Los Angeles
Writers from Tel Aviv
Writers Guild of America Award winners